IRSA may refer to:

 Istituto per le Ricerche di Storia dell'Arte, a publishing house in Poland
 Inversiones y Representaciones Sociedad Anónima, a real estate development firm in Argentina 
 Indus River System Authority, an agency of the Pakistani government
 NASA/IPAC Infrared Science Archive